Deanne Butler (born 11 August 1981) is a former Australian female professional basketball player.

References
Profile at australiabasket.com

1981 births
Living people
People from Wangaratta
Australian women's basketball players
Point guards